Cound Brook (pronounced COOnd) is a tributary of the River Severn in Shropshire, England, running to south of the county town Shrewsbury.

The flow of the Cound Brook can vary from sluggish in a dry summer to a raging torrent in winter or spring. The river is crossed by several bridges along its route including two historic and unusual iron bridges. Several other roads cross the river as fords. The river has breached its banks on the lower flood plain several times in the past and is now monitored by the local rivers authority.

The river is named after Cound, the last settlement it passes through prior to the confluence with the River Severn. Conversely one of the villages on its route, Condover, is thought to have been named after the river during the late medieval period.

The Coundmoor Brook is a smaller watercourse which flows into the Cound Brook near its confluence with the Severn at Cound.

Sources
The Cound rises from minor watercourses running off the Long Mynd and Caer Caradoc in the northern part of the "Stretton Gap", between the settlements of Church Stretton and All Stretton. One of the main initial tributaries is the stream that runs through the Carding Mill Valley, which is named "Ashbrook" as it flows through Church Stretton. The embryonic river descends towards the Shropshire-Severn plain and heads north east mirroring the route of the A49 main road and the Shrewsbury to Hereford railway line.

Middle route
The brook passes to the east of Leebotwood and west of Longnor and the Medieval deer park there. Continuing to the east of Dorrington village, at Stapleton the Cound changes direction and heads eastwards.

The Cound passes through the historic and picturesque Condover with its conservation area and many Listed buildings. A water mill was recorded as standing on the Cound in Condover at the time of the Domesday Book. After Condover the river heads south east through Boreton.

Iron bridges

To the north of the village of Cantlop there is an unusual cast-iron single-span bridge known as the Cantlop Bridge, that was designed and constructed by Thomas Telford in 1818. Originally a road bridge to cross the Cound Brook, it now remains only as a historic monument as the original 19th century road route is now diverted alongside on a modern bridge.

The river then passes through the village of Cound and under another iron bridge, the Coundarbour bridge, also designed and built by Telford, the oldest iron bridge still in normal everyday use anywhere in the world and built in 1797. (Abraham Darby's famous Iron Bridge in Ironbridge, Telford,  had closed to vehicular traffic in 1934 and is now only open to pedestrians.)

Discharge
The Cound Brook now follows an increasingly meandering route across a low lying flood plain until it discharges into the River Severn a few hundred yards west of Eyton on Severn and less than a mile south from Wroxeter (with its Roman city ruins), close to the northern end of the Watling Street Roman road from Dover.

References

Rivers of Shropshire
Tributaries of the River Severn
Shrewsbury and Atcham
Church Stretton
1Cound